The year 1805 in archaeology involved some significant events.

Explorations 
 The Snake River is discovered by the Lewis and Clark Expedition.

Excavations 
Clearance and survey of the 8th century Prambanan Hindu temple compound on Java.

Finds 
 A Roman mosaic is discovered under the southwest angle of the Bank of England, at a depth of 12 feet (3 m).
 The Codex Borgia is discovered by Alexander von Humboldt among the effects of Cardinal Stefano Borgia.

Other events 
 The British Museum purchases Charles Townley's collection of Roman sculpture.

Publications

Births 
 June 30 - Rudolf Wagner, German anatomist, physiologist, anthropologist and archaeologist (d. 1864).
 November 28 - John Lloyd Stephens, American explorer of Maya civilization sites in Central America (d. 1852)

Deaths

References

Archaeology
Archaeology by year
Archaeology
Archaeology